Janna Jyrkinen (born 14 February 2007) is a Finnish figure skater. She is the 2022 CS Warsaw Cup bronze medalist, the 2022 Volvo Open Cup champion, and the 2023 Finnish national champion. She achieved a top-ten result at the 2023 European Championships, where she finished seventh.

Personal life 
Jyrkinen was born on 14 February 2007 in Helsinki, Finland. She has a younger sister, Elina.

Programs

Competitive highlights 
GP: Grand Prix; CS: Challenger Series; JGP: Junior Grand Prix.

References

External links 
 

2007 births
Living people
People from Lappeenranta
Finnish female single skaters
21st-century Finnish women